The 1908 Utah Agricultural Aggies football team was an American football team that represented Utah Agricultural College (later renamed Utah State University) during the 1908 college football season. In their second and final season under head coach Fred M. Walker, the Aggies compiled a 4–2 record and outscored opponents by a total of 142 to 39.

Walker went on to play Major League Baseball from 1910 to 1915. He became known as "Mysterious" Walker.

Schedule

References

Utah Agricultural
Utah State Aggies football seasons
Utah Agricultural Aggies football